Ian Wesley Whimster MRCPath (3 September 1923 – 18 January 1979) was a reader of dermatology histopathology at St Thomas' Hospital, London. He gained international recognition for his study of comparative anatomy and experiments with reptiles, particularly observing their colour patterns in relation to their nerve supply. He was part of the medical student team that went into Bergen-Belsen concentration camp in 1945, after it was liberated by British troops. On return, he made numerous contributions to dermatology, including the definition of keratoacanthoma, the distinction between pemphigus and pemphigoid and descriptions of melanocytes and malignant melanoma. He died in a road traffic accident at the age of 55.

Early life
Ian Whimster was born in 1923. He was educated at Lancing College, followed by Clare College, Cambridge, before gaining admission to St Thomas' Hospital medical school and then completing his MB in 1946. His early appointments were at St Thomas's where he also developed his interest in dermatology.

Career
During his junior years, Whimster was part of the medical student team that went into Bergen-Belsen concentration camp in 1945, after it was liberated by British troops. With the encouragement and support from Geoffrey Dowling, he developed an interest in the skin and Whimster soon became closely associated with Arthur Rook, working on the histopathology of keratoacanthoma and the distinction between the bullous diseases pemphigoid and pemphigus.

Whimster gained international recognition for his work on comparative anatomy and experiments with reptiles, particularly observing their colour patterns in relation to their nerve supply. His observations on humans and reptiles formed the basis of his classic papers on spottiness. He became adept at breeding small reptiles for his experiments and devoted to their care.

His statement that "some invisible intersegmental boundaries, whose existence we have been taught to expect by comparative anatomy and embryology, are only revealed by disease" stemmed from Whimster's interest in the causes of linear or sharply demarcated rashes unexplained by external stimuli.

Whimster's observations in the 1950s, of increased capillary loops next to a venous ulcer, as examined under the microscope, later facilitated the correlation between venous hypertension and venous ulceration.

Whimster was also a leading authority on the melanocyte and an expert in malignant melanoma. In addition, he collaborated with Hugh Wallace and studied vulval leukoplakia.

Whimster often suffered from severe depression which caused his research to stall. One of his obituary writers commented on the lasting impression that his experience at Belsen had left on him.

Death and legacy
Whimster died in a road traffic accident on 18 January 1979 at the age of 55.

Since 1984, the British Association of Dermatologists has awarded the Whimster prize, which is presented every three years.

Selected publications

References

Further reading
"Genetic mosaicism, Whimster's proposals- views on skin patterns", Journal of the Royal Society of Medicine, Vol. 86, April 1993, p. 216.
"Belsen: Medical Aspects of a World War 11 Concentration Camp". Col E. E. Vella Journal 0/ the RoyaL Army Medical Corps (1984)

1923 births
1979 deaths
British pathologists
People educated at Lancing College
Road incident deaths in England
Alumni of Clare College, Cambridge
Physicians of St Thomas' Hospital
London medical students who assisted at Belsen